The 130th Field Artillery Brigade is a field artillery brigade of the United States Army, provided by the Kansas Army National Guard.

The 130th Field Artillery history in the Kansas Army National Guard dates back to 1917, where its lineage as part of the 35th Infantry Division can be traced through both World Wars, the Korean War and, most recently, the war in Iraq 2003-2011. On June 1, 1978, the 130th was redesignated as the 130th Field Artillery Brigade.

In 1985, it was again designated as the 35th Division Artillery with the reactivation of the 35th Infantry Division. The 130th was reconstituted again on Sept. 2, 1997, in the Kansas Army National Guard in Topeka. Following its Operation Iraqi Freedom deployment, the brigade was inactivated on Nov. 10, 2007.

The brigade was reactivated on October 19, 2014.

Current Structure 
The brigade now comprises the following units of the Kansas Army National Guard:

 130th Field Artillery Brigade (130th FAB), Kansas Army National Guard 
 Headquarters and Headquarters Battery (HHB)
 2nd Battalion, 130th Field Artillery Regiment (2-130th FAR) (HIMARS) High Mobility Artillery Rocket System
 1st Battalion, 161st Field Artillery Regiment (1-161st FAR) (M109 A6 howitzer)
 997th Brigade Support Battalion (997th BSB)
 330th Signal Company

References

Field artillery brigades of the United States Army
Fires Brigades of the United States Army
Military units and formations established in 1978
Military units and formations in Kansas